The Florida Ornithological Society (FOS) is a Florida organization formed to promote field ornithology and facilitate contact between persons interested in birds.

It was founded October 14, 1972, under the sponsorship of the Florida Audubon Society, at a Lakeland, Florida, meeting attended by more than 100 ornithologists and serious birders.

The society's publications include the quarterly journal Florida Field Naturalist, a special publication series, and a quarterly newsletter. Annual activities of the FOS include participation in the North American Migration Count and  Christmas bird count. The society also provides grants in aid for bird research and bird-related environmental education.

See also
 List of Florida birds
 List of state ornithological organizations in the United States

References

External links
 Florida Ornithological Society website

Ornithological citizen science
Ornithological organizations in the United States
Environmental organizations based in Florida
Natural history of Florida
Organizations based in Florida
Environmental organizations established in 1972
1972 establishments in Florida